Sony Pictures Networks India (SPN), in association with Sony Pictures Television (SPT) has launched Sony Kal (stylised as Sony KAL Hindi) channel on 28 January 2022 in the US and Canada. It broadcasts Indian drama and comedy television series and is availa ble for free of cost on major smart tv platforms like xumo, LG channels, sling and TCL.

Programming
 Bade Achhe Lagte Hain
 Band Baaja Bandh Darwaza
 Dr. Madhumati On Duty
 Ek Rishta Saajhedari Ka
 Jassi Jaissi Koi Nahin
 Man Mein Hai Visshwas
 Shankar Jaikishan 3 in 1
 Super Sisters – Chalega Pyar Ka Jaadu

References

External links 

 

Television channels and stations established in 2022
Hindi-language television channels in India
Sony Pictures Entertainment
Sony Pictures Networks India
Foreign-language television stations in the United States
Television stations in the United States
Lists of television channels in Canada